Carn Liath (976 m) is a mountain in the Grampian Mountains of Scotland. It lies east of Blair Atholl in Perthshire, Scotland.

Although belonging to the vast Beinn a' Ghlò massif, Càrn Liath is a mountain in its own right. It is prominent from the main A9 road to the west and is the most accessible of Beinn a' Ghlò's three Munros. Climbs usually start from the nearby Loch Moraig, and from there it can either be climbed on its own or as part of the long Beinn a' Ghló traverse. The peak also suffers from visible erosion on its slopes.

References

Mountains and hills of Perth and Kinross
Marilyns of Scotland
Munros